Lomnice is a municipality and village in Sokolov District in the Karlovy Vary Region of the Czech Republic. It has about 1,400 inhabitants.

Administrative parts
The village of Týn is an administrative part of Lomnice.

References

Villages in Sokolov District